Elsthorpe is a village in the Central Hawke's Bay District and Hawke's Bay Region of New Zealand's North Island. It is located east of Ōtāne, Waipawa and State Highway 2 and west of the east coast.

It began as a sheep station, named after Elsthorpe, a hamlet in the English county of Lincolnshire. It is now a small settlement, supporting neighbouring sheep farms.

The local St Stephen's Chapel holds five services during the year under the oversight of St Luke's Anglican Church in Havelock North. The village also features a memorial to Royal New Zealand Air Force helicopter pilot Flight Lieutenant William Waterhouse, who died in a Vietnam War training accident in Canberra in January 1969.

The Elsthorpe and neighbouring Omakere rugby union teams were featured in a New Zealand television advertisement for coverage of the 2019 Rugby World Cup.

Education
Elsthorpe School is a Year 1-8 co-educational state primary school.

References

Central Hawke's Bay District
Populated places in the Hawke's Bay Region